Dirk Bovensmann is a former West German slalom canoeist who competed in the 1980s. He won a silver medal in the K-1 team event at the 1983 ICF Canoe Slalom World Championships in Meran.

References

German male canoeists
Living people
Year of birth missing (living people)
Medalists at the ICF Canoe Slalom World Championships